The East Asian Games (Tōa Kyōgi Taikai), also known as the Asian Development Games (Kōa Kyōgi Taikai) were multi-sport events organized by the Japan Association of Athletics Federations (JAAA). The games were meant to be a replacement to the cancelled 1938 Far Eastern Championship Games and 1940 Summer Olympics originally to be hosted by Japan, and also served as a propaganda tool for Japan.

Background
Japan had been a participant in the Far Eastern Championship Games since its inception and a member of its Far Eastern Athletic Association (FEAA) since 1917. While the aim of the organization was for every East Asian country to join, the attempts made by Japan for Manchukuo to join were rejected by China, who was also a member of the FEAA, leading to the organization's dissolution. Japan and the Philippines established the Oriental Sports Association (Tōyō Taiiku Kyōkai, OSA), which planned two tournaments, now known as the Oriental Games (Tōyō Senshuken): one in Tokyo (1938) and Manila (1942). Both were cancelled as a result of the Second Sino–Japanese War.

The Philippines and Manchukuo were drawn back by these series of actions by Japan. Manchukuo formally joined the OSA and the Manchukuo Athletic Association was created. The Philippines felt resentment for establishing the Oriental Association with the aim of "peace in the East". During negotiations with the government, which had promised independence by 1944, it was thought that getting involved in the Oriental Games, which was problematic from an international perspective, would be disadvantageous in future negotiations. On the other hand, Japan was aiming to bid for the 1940 Summer Olympics, and the existence of the OSA would have a disadvantageous effect on the bid for the Olympics. In addition, although there was a movement to allow China into the OSA, no specific offer was made.

Even after the Tokyo Olympics were officially decided in July 1936, there was no progress toward holding the Olympic Games, such as the difference in interest among sports groups toward the Oriental Games in Japan, China's refusal to join the Oriental Association, and the Philippines' declaration of non-participation in the first Games. On top of this, Manchuria requested participation in the Tokyo Olympics, but was rejected by the Japanese side as it would develop into a political problem.

When the Second Sino-Japanese War broke out on July 7, 1937, Ichirō Kōno, a member of the Imperial Diet, immediately requested that the Olympics be forfeited. Also cancelled were the 1938 Tokyo games, which led to the planning of a new competition. This would culminate in the 1939 tournament between Japan, Manchukuo and China (Nanking).

At that time, Manchukuo and China had a positive view that sports could be effectively used as a diplomatic tool, thus showing enthusiasm for the idea, but since China could not organize a team that could participate in all competitions, it  was decided that it would be held as an invitational tournament. The event was to be hosted in Hsinking, with various stadiums being built as part of a National Sports Complex as a result.

Japan–Manchuria–China Friendship Games

The Japan–Manchuria–China Friendship Games (Nichiman Hana Kōkan Kyōgi Taikai) began with an opening ceremony on August 31, although weather conditions meant that the competition began the next day. Despite this gesture, the event was marked by terrible weather conditions, as rain poured throughout the tournament.

There were four sports: track and field, basketball, volleyball, and soccer. Swimming, baseball, martial arts, gymnastics, and other sports which were popular in Japan, were not implemented. The Manchurian team was particularly excited over baseball, but due to the Tokyo Big6 Baseball League's refusal to participate, the sport did not take place. China did not participate in volleyball, leaving Japan and Manchukuo to play against each other, with the remaining three sports being the only ones to feature all three teams.

The focus of this tournament was how well Manchukuo and China could compete against Japan. Soccer was the highlight of the tournament due to North China being a place where soccer flourished. Not only had China won nine consecutive victories in the Far Eastern Championship Games, but in Manchukuo soccer was the national sport, and Japan had strengthened its team by defeating the Swedish team at the Berlin Olympics. As a result, a tough fight was expected.

In the end, Japan won both games (being the only scoring team), and there was a brawl in the match between Japan and China. Japan won all the basketball and volleyball games. In track and field, despite the unexpected performance of China, Japan finished first and Manchukuo finished second.

Manchuria was based on the founding principle of "Five Races Under One Union" (similar to the Chinese principle), but in this tournament, the Manchurian, Korean, and Caucasian groups were not harmonious as a team, and the Manchurian audience found itself rooting for the Chinese team instead of the Manchurian one. Despite the political use of this tournament, such as the fact that the team was made up of only Chinese players, the results revealed a different reality among the Mainland Chinese.

In addition, before and after this tournament, tournaments in which Korea participated in addition to Manchuria and China were held, and from the athletes' side, this tournament was just a part of a series of competitions.

Prelude to the 1940 Games
In November 1939, the OSA was dissolved and the "Greater East Asia Athletic Association" was newly established with the membership of Japan, Manchukuo, the Philippines, China, Thailand, and Burma. Then, in June 1940, it was decided that the "East Asian Games" would be held in Japan as a substitute for the cancelled Tokyo Olympics and as part of the celebrations commemorating the 2,600th anniversary of the ascension of Emperor Jimmu and thus, the establishment of the Japanese Empire. Japan is promoted as "a new position in the East Asia sports system." Some sources suggest that this tournament is an advanced version of the 1939 games, being the de facto Second East Asian Games as a result. It was the first time in ten years since the 9th Far Eastern Championship Games that an international competition was held in Japan.

Of all the countries that participated in this tournament, which was held twice, Manchukuo, China, and Mengjiang had strong ties with Japan. The Philippines and Hawaii were territories of the United States, but nevertheless Japanese immigrants in Hawaii participated in the tournament.

1940 East Asian Games

The 1940 East Asian Games, officially the East Asian Games of the Year 2600, were held from 5 to 16 June 1940. 6 different countries participated in the event, with over 700 athletes attending. Besides the participating countries, foreigners residing in Japan (excluding Manchus, Koreans and Chinese) were allowed to participate as "foreign residents."

The games were divided between two tournaments: one in Tokyo held from June 5 to 9, 1940, and a second one in Kansai Region, held from June 13 to 16. Besides the regular sports events, demonstrations of archery and Mongolian Sumo were also held. The games were officially declared open by Yasuhito, a younger brother of Hirohito, on June 9, 1940, during the opening ceremony in Meiji Jingu Gaien Stadium in Tokyo.

Similar to the games in Berlin, the event was reportedly used by Japan to strengthen inter-Asian relations and to promote its war effort, as seen in articles published at the time, such as one in Issue 121 of the Shashin Shūhō, which referred to the Second Sino–Japanese War as a "Holy War" (seisen).

An emblem (and a flag which featured it) was designed for the event, which featured a figure with the numbers "2600" overlaid on top of it. The numbers represented the celebration of Emperor Jimmu, but also alluded to the cancelled Olympic event, as the digits' design was reminiscent of that of the Olympic rings.

Japanese athletes won 10 out of 18 individual track and field events, and Japan took first place in most of the team events. Baseball was described as the most popular sport of the event by Asahi Sports and Sunday Mainichi. Also highlighted was the rivalry between the Japanese and Philippine teams, who ended first and second place in the tournament, respectively.

The Japanese national team featured one Korean player, Kim Won-Kwon, and the Manchurian national team featured players of Japanese and Russian descent.

Venues

Tokyo
Meiji Shrine Outer Garden
Meiji Jingu Gaien Stadium - Opening and closing ceremonies, performance competitions, athletics, cycling (track), football, rugby, hockey
Meiji Jingu Gaien Sumo Hall - basketball, volleyball,
Meiji Jingu Stadium - Baseball
Nippon Seinenkan - Wrestling
Denen Coliseum - Tennis
Ōmiya Velodrome - Bicycle (Track)
 - table tennis
Hibiya Park - Soft Tennis
Yokohama - Kominato - Yacht
Katase - Ōiso - Odawara - Bicycle (Road)

Kansai
Kashihara
Kashihara Jingu Gaien Outdoor Public Hall - Opening Ceremony, Closing Ceremony, Soft Tennis, Basketball
Kashihara Stadium - Athletics, handball, volleyball
Construction Hall - Table Tennis

Koshien - Bicycle
Koshien International Club - Tennis
Koshien Stadium - Baseball
Minami Koshien - Football
 - Yacht
Hanazono Rugby Stadium

Participants

 Hawaii

 

 Thailand (withdrew)

Schedule
The following table shows the original schedule, as the baseball and tennis competitions of the Kansai tournament were cancelled due to rain.

Sports


















1942 East Asian Games

The 1942 East Asian Games, officially the East Asian Games of the 10th Anniversary of Manchukuo Celebration, were held in Hsinking from August 8–11, 1942 to commemorate the 10th anniversary of the establishment of Manchukuo. Four countries and around 680 athletes participated in the event. A football match between Japan and Korea was played in Keijō on August 16, although this match's relation to the tournament is disputed.

A winter tournament was also held on February 7–8, 1943, in which Japan and Manchukuo participated with over 70 athletes. A ski competition was held on February 20 and 21 of the same year and was combined with the Kwantung Army's Winter Training Tournament.

Compared to past competitions, the Manchurian team (although actually Japanese) was more prominent in this competition. The opening ceremony was held in the presence of Emperor Kangde. This tournament was held after the outbreak of the Pacific War.

Venues

Summer
National Sports Complex (Hsinking)

Winter
Shinkyo Kodama Park ice slide - ice sports
Tonghua Nanshan Ski Resort - Ski Competition

Participants

Sports

|-
| Summer



















| Winter
 Ice Competition



 Ski Competition



Army
Long-distance running
Messenger race
Scout race
Troop maneuver race
|}

See also
Far Eastern Championship Games
Greater East Asia Co-Prosperity Sphere
1934 FIFA World Cup
1936 Summer Olympics
Games of the New Emerging Forces

References

Bibliography
 
 
 
 
 

East Asian Games
East Asian Games
East Asian Games
East Asian Games
East Asian
East Asian Games
East Asian Games
East Asian Games
East Asian Games
Multi-sport events in Japan